Anthony Steen (born May 9, 1990) is a former American football center. He played college football at Alabama. Steen was a member of Alabama's 2009 national championship team during his redshirt year as a freshman and played as a starting offensive guard for both the 2011 and 2012 national championship teams. After going undrafted in the 2014 NFL Draft, Steen signed as an undrafted free agent with the Arizona Cardinals.

High school career
Steen played high school football at the Lee Academy in Clarksdale, Mississippi and was a part of the 2009 recruiting class at Alabama. He verbally committed to the Crimson Tide on July 29, 2008, and officially signed on National Signing Day the following February. He selected Alabama over offers from Florida State, Miami, Mississippi State, and Southern Miss.

College career
After Steen was redshirted for the 2009 season, he started the final two regular season games of the 2010 season after starting guard Barrett Jones was injured against Mississippi State.

For the 2011 season, Steen became a starter on the offensive line at the guard position. He played in all 13 games, but only started in 9 after he suffered concussion against Ole Miss. For his redshirt junior season in 2012, Steen started all 14 games at the right guard position and was named the team's offensive player of the week for his performance against Western Carolina. At the conclusion of the season, Steen was the only member of the offensive line that did not record a penalty or allow a quarterback sack for the season. After the completion of the 2012 season, Steen announced he would return for his senior season. At the time of his announcement Steen cited both to improve his draft stock as well as a desire to compete for one final season at Alabama as his reasons for remaining with the Crimson Tide. For the 2014 NFL Draft, Steen is ranked as one of the top offensive guards in his class. For his final season at Alabama, Steen and Cyrus Kouandjio were the only returning starters on the offensive line and both were also named to various award watchlists for the 2013 season.

As the only senior on the offensive line for the 2013 season, Steen was the leader of the line. For his performance against Kentucky, Steen was recognized as SEC Offensive Linemen of the Week.

Steen was a second-team All-Southeastern Conference (SEC) selection.

Professional career

Arizona Cardinals
After going undrafted in the 2014 NFL Draft, Steen signed with the Arizona Cardinals as an undrafted free agent on May 12, 2014. The Cardinals released Steen on August 30, 2014, but he was re-signed to their practice squad the next day.

On September 5, 2015, he was released by the Cardinals. On September 10, 2015, Steen was brought back to the team and was placed on the practice squad. On September 22, 2015, he was released by the Cardinals.

Miami Dolphins
On November 24, 2015, Steen was signed to the Dolphins' practice squad.

Steen made the Dolphins' final roster in 2016, starting seven games at center in place of injured Pro Bowl starter Mike Pouncey.

In 2017, Steen was named the starting left guard to start the season. He started the first six games before being placed on injured reserve on October 31, 2017 with a foot injury.

References

External links
Alabama Crimson Tide bio

1990 births
Living people
American football offensive guards
Alabama Crimson Tide football players
Arizona Cardinals players
Miami Dolphins players
Sportspeople from Clarksdale, Mississippi
Players of American football from Mississippi
People from Lambert, Mississippi